The Chinese Taipei national handball team is the national team of Chinese Taipei. It is governed by the Chinese Taipei Handball Association and takes part in international handball competitions. It has competed in the Asian Men's Handball Championship six times, most recently in 2000.

Asian Championship record

  1987  – 7th place
  1989  – 7th place
  1991  – 7th place
  1993  – 10th place
  1995  – 7th place
  2000  – 4th place

External links

IHF profile

Men's national handball teams
National sports teams of Taiwan
Handball in Taiwan